Majilpur Shyamsundar Balika Vidyalaya (abbreviated as MSBV) is a government-sponsored high school in the Jaynagar Majilpur of the South 24 Parganas district in the Indian state of West Bengal. This is a girls' only school for the secondary and higher secondary level students. Its medium of instruction is Bengali.

Geography

History
It is one of the oldest schools in the whole country.

Affiliations
The school is affiliated to the West Bengal Board of Secondary Education for secondary level students, and to the West Bengal Council of Higher Secondary Education for higher secondary level students.

References

Day schools
Schools in Colonial India
Government schools in India
Girls' schools in West Bengal
High schools and secondary schools in West Bengal
Schools in South 24 Parganas district
Education in Jaynagar Majilpur
Educational institutions established in 1934
1934 establishments in British India
1934 establishments in India